National Corndog Day is a celebration concerning basketball, the corn dog (A corn dog is usually a hot dog sausage coated in a thick layer of cornmeal batter), Tater Tots, and American beer that occurs in March of every year on the first Saturday of the NCAA Men's Division I Basketball Championship.

History 

National Corndog Day was inaugurated in 1992 in Corvallis, Oregon by Brady Sahnow and Henry Otley.  The first celebration was informal and involved only corndogs and basketball.  In subsequent years, National Corndog day was expanded to include tater tots and beer and gradually spread to other cities.  The celebration currently is sponsored by Foster Farms, a Livingston, California-based poultry producer, PBR, a US Midwest-based beer company, and Jones Soda.  Operations for National Corndog Day currently are governed by a board of directors consisting of event hosts (or "city captains") based in various cities in the United States.

By 2007, parties celebrating National Corndog Day occurred at 113 locations in more than 30 U.S. states, the District of Columbia and Australia. In 2008 participation increased to nearly 5, 000 parties on five continents, including one at McMurdo Station in Antarctica. In 2009 participation fell back to the trend line from the 2008 peak, with nearly 400 on March 21, 2009. National Corndog Day 2009 took place on Saturday, March 21st, 2009. That same year, musical artist and contest winner, Ben Brennan, wrote and performed the National Corndog Day theme song.  

On March 16, 2012, Oregon Governor John A. Kitzhaber issued a Proclamation declaring March 17, 2012 to be National Corndog Day.

See also 
Corn dog
Hot dog
 List of food days

Notes

References
 Mary Ann Albright, "Corndog Buffs Have Their Day," Corvallis Gazette-Times (Corvallis, Oregon), March 16, 2007, Top Story, Pg. 1.
 Ricardo Baca, "Why I adore the lowly corn dog", Denver Post (Denver, CO), March 15, 2006, Sec. Food and Dining, . 
 Staff, "Don't wait for the state fair to come back; make your own corn dogs", Anchorage Daily News, October 1, 2003, Sec. Life, Pg. D2.
 Su-Jin Yim, "Every Corndog Has Its (URP) Day", The Oregonian (Portland, OR), March 16, 2002, Sec. Living, Pg. CO1.
 In Tidbits, The Gothamist, March 17, 2006 .

External links 
Official National Corndog Day Website
WGN Radio coverage of the 15th annual National Corndog Day celebration

Hot dogs
Unofficial observances
Recurring events established in 1992
March observances
Observances about food and drink